Andrzejówka  (Andriyivka) is a village in the administrative district of Gmina Muszyna, within Nowy Sącz County, Lesser Poland Voivodeship, in southern Poland, close to the border with Slovakia.

The village existed already in the 13th century, but was formally established under German law in 1352.

References

Villages in Nowy Sącz County